Anatoliy Volkov is a Soviet sprint canoer who competed in the mid-1980s. He won two medals in the C-1 500 m event at the ICF Canoe Sprint World Championships with a silver in 1985 and a bronze in 1983.

References

Living people
Soviet male canoeists
Year of birth missing (living people)
Russian male canoeists
ICF Canoe Sprint World Championships medalists in Canadian